The Resurrection of Pigboy Crabshaw is a 1967 album by the Butterfield Blues Band, their third release. Its name refers to Elvin Bishop, whose role shifted to lead guitarist after Mike Bloomfield departed to form the Electric Flag. The album marked a slight shift in the band's sound towards R&B and was the first Butterfield record to feature a horn section, which included a young David Sanborn on alto saxophone.

The Resurrection of Pigboy Crabshaw generally received mixed to favorable reviews from critics, and reached number 52 in the American Billboard 200 charts in 1968.

Reception

Michael G. Nastos wrote in a review of The Resurrection of Pigboy Crabshaw at AllMusic that Paul Butterfield "really com[es] into his own" here with his vocals and harmonica, and the band are "as cohesive a unit as you'd find in this time period". He described the closing track, "Tollin' Bells" as "somewhat psychedelic", adding that the guitar and the "slow, ringing, resonant keyboard evokes a haunting feeling." Overall Nastos called the album "likely the single best Butterfield album of this time period and you'd be well served to pick this one up."

A 1968 review in Record Mirror stated that on this album the band's blues sound has "hardened" with "stronger" and "more confiden[t]" vocals. The reviewer said the tracks' accompaniments are "clear and well recorded" with "clever" arrangements, although he preferred their own material to some of the covers they did, like "One More Heartache" and "Drivin' Wheel".

In another review from 1968, Rolling Stone magazine felt that the band's newly acquired horn section is not fully utilized on this album and tends to "riff unobtrusively" in the background, letting Bishop's guitar and Butterfield's voice take the lead. The solos are "short, though musically interesting", but often reduce to "mechanical-sounding, repetitive arrangements." The reviewer called "Drivin' Wheel" the album's "most successful" track, and concluded that while Resurrection "may not show the group to best advantage", they are "the most venturesome and exciting players of blues-based rock around".

Track listing

Personnel
The Butterfield Blues Band
 Paul Butterfield – vocals, harmonica
 Elvin Bishop – guitar 
 Mark Naftalin – keyboards
 Bugsy Maugh – bass, vocals on "Drivin' Wheel"
 Phil Wilson – drums
with:
 Gene Dinwiddie – tenor saxophone
 David Sanborn – alto saxophone
 Keith Johnson – trumpet
Technical
William S. Harvey – cover design, art direction
Kim Whitesides – cover artwork
Joel Brodsky – back cover photography

Charts

Notes

References

External links
The Resurrection of Pigboy Crabshaw at Discogs

1967 albums
Paul Butterfield Blues Band albums
Elektra Records albums